The Mexcala Formation is a Late Cretaceous (late Turonian to late Maastrichtian) geologic formation in Guerrero state, southern Mexico.

Fossil content 
Fossil ornithopod tracks assigned to Hadrosauridae indet. and sauropod tracks have been reported from the formation.

Other fossils from the formation include:

Ammonites 

 Barroisiceras (Texanites) dentatocarinatum
 Coilopoceras colleti
 C. requienianum
 Forresteria (Forresteria) alluaudi
 Peroniceras aff. tricarinatum
 P. cf. subtricarinatum
 Pseudotissotia galliennei
 Barroisiceras cf. alstadenense
 Barroisiceras sp.
 Peroniceras sp.

See also 
 List of fossiliferous stratigraphic units in Mexico
 List of dinosaur-bearing rock formations
 List of stratigraphic units with ornithischian tracks
 Ornithopod tracks

References

Bibliography 
 A. A. Ramírez Velasco, R. Hernández Rivera, and R. Servin Pichardo. 2014. The hadrosaurian record from Mexico. In D. A. Eberth & D. C. Evans (ed.), Hadrosaurs 340-360
  
 S. Kiel and M. d. C. Perrilliat. 2001. New gastropods from the Maastrichtian of the Mexcala Formation in Guerrero, southern Mexico, part 1: Stromboidea. Neues Jahrbuch für Geologie und Paläontologie, Abhandlungen 222(3):407-426
 E. Cabral Cano, H. R. Lang, and C. G. A. Harrison. 2000. Stratigraphic Assessment of the Arcelia-Teloloapan area, Southern Mexico: Implications for Southern Mexico's Post-Neocomian Tectonic Evolution. Journal of South American Earth Science 13:443-457
 M. C. Perrilliat, F.J. Vega, and R. Corona. 2000. Early Maastrictian mollusca from the Mexcala formation of the state of Guerro, southern Mexico. Journal of Paleontology 74(1):7-24
 I. Ferrusquia Villafranca, E. Jimenes Hidalgo, and V. M. Bravo Cuevas. 1995. Jurassic and Cretaceous dinosaur footprints from Mexico: additions and revisions. Journal of Vertebrate Paleontology 15(3, suppl.):28A
 C. González Arreola. 1977. Amonitas del Coniaciano (Cretacico superior) de la region de Tepetlapa, estado de Guerrero [Coniacian (Upper Cretaceous) ammonoids from the Tepetlapa region (Guerrero)]. Revista Universidad Nacional Autonoma de Mexico, Instituto de Geologia 1(2):167-173

Geologic formations of Mexico
Upper Cretaceous Series of North America
Cretaceous Mexico
Maastrichtian Stage
Campanian Stage
Santonian Stage
Coniacian Stage
Turonian Stage
Limestone formations
Sandstone formations
Marl formations
Shale formations
Lagoonal deposits
Shallow marine deposits
Ichnofossiliferous formations
Paleontology in Mexico
Natural history of Guerrero